Pista is a genus of polychaete worms comprising around 100 species.

References

Terebellida